The Davao-South Regional Football Association or DRFA is a Filipino football association based in Davao City. It works under the Philippine Football Federation as a provincial football association for Davao City. This scope was expanded by a mandate by the Philippine Football Federation allowing the Association's jurisdiction over clubs in Davao del Sur and Davao Oriental. The DRFA sends a team to represent the region in the yearly PFF National Men's Club Championship.

Member clubs
As of January 2015, there are 22 clubs registered with the Davao-South Regional FA, all of which are based in Davao City. Other clubs from Davao City as well as Davao del Sur and Davao Oriental are eligible for registration with the Association. All registered clubs under the Association are sanctioned by the Philippine Football Federation.

Board of Trustees 
Taken from the DRFA's website 15 April 2019
Henry B. Sabate - President
Gerry G. Zanoria - Vice President
David Dwight B. Peñano - General Secretary
Rachelle Delos Reyes - Female Representative
Ramonito Carreon
Joe Castillo
Janice Celestial
Danny Boy Fernandez
Carlos Labadora
Carlos Martin
Erwin Protacio

Competitions
The DRFA also runs several competitions:
 Allianz National Youth Futsal Invitational 
 Araw ng Dabaw FootFest
 PIA CUP

External links 
 Official website
Davao FA official website (archived from original)

References

Football governing bodies in the Philippines
Sports in Davao del Sur